Richebourg is a commune in the Pas-de-Calais department in northern France. It was formed on 21 February 1971 by merging Richebourg-Saint-Vaast and Richebourg-l'Avoué. In 1916 it was the site of the Battle of the Boar's Head.

Bordering communes
Arrondissement of Béthune:
Festubert
La Couture
Vieille-Chapelle
Violaines
Laventie
Lorgies
Neuve-Chapelle
Lestrem
Arrondissement of Dunkerque (Nord department:
La Gorgue

Population

See also
Communes of the Pas-de-Calais department

References

Communes of Pas-de-Calais